Detentionaire is a Canadian animated series created by Daniel Bryan Franklin and Charles Johnston and produced by Nelvana. The show consists of 4 seasons of 13 episodes each, except for the first one which contains 14 due to including the pilot episode. Both Canadian and Australian airdates are provided; all seasons except the first one aired in Australia prior to airing in Canada.

Series overview

Episodes

Season 1 (2011–12)

Season 2 (2012)

Season 3 (2013)

Season 4 (2013–14)

References 

Lists of Canadian children's animated television series episodes